The 01633 telephone area code covers the city of Newport and surrounding areas in the United Kingdom. Before PhONEday the area code was 0633, which was originally dialled as "0NE3" where the "NE" were formed from the first two letters of NEwport on the telephone dial. In common with all other British area codes the initial '0' is a trunk prefix that is dropped when dialling from abroad.

Coverage
The 14 exchanges listed in the table below form the 01633 code area as of 2012:

History
The Group switching centre (GSC) for the Newport charge group was the Savoy exchange. This exchange alongside the Chartist, Maindee and Maesglas exchanges formed the Newport linked numbering scheme whereby local numbers could be dialled directly and with the STD code 0633. The surrounding dependent exchanges could be accessed via local codes and longer STD codes based on 0633.

Dependent exchanges
Smaller exchanges around the GSC were parented onto it. From them the digit 9 was dialled to access the GSC. The codes from the GSC to the dependent exchanges are listed in the table below:

To dial from one dependent exchange to another one first dialled 9 to access the GSC then dialled the local code to the destination exchange. Thus a caller from Machen to Magor would dial 947 before the subscriber's number and a caller from Risca to Cwmbran would dial 93. A caller to a Newport number in the linked numbering scheme would simply dial 9.

Changes
Over time the local codes were abolished and the dependent exchanges became part of the linked numbering scheme. This meant the 3, 4 and 5-digit numbers became 6-digit numbers by means of a prefix that was unique in the 0633 code area.
By 1983 Llanwern 4-digit numbers (2000–3999) were prefixed with 41.
Caerleon 4-digit numbers were prefixed by 42. All were 6-digit by 1976.
Rhiwderin 4-digit numbers were prefixed by 89.
Risca 3-digit numbers were prefixed by 600 and 4-digit numbers prefixed by 61. All were 6-digit by 1974.
Penhow 3-digit numbers were prefixed with 400. All were 6-digit by 1983.
Machen 3-digit numbers were prefixed with 440. All were 6-digit by 1983.
Magor 3-digit numbers were prefixed with 880. All were 6-digit by 1983.
Castleton 3-digit numbers were prefixed with 680. All were 6-digit by 1979.
Tredunnock 3-digit numbers were prefixed with 450.
Cwmbran 4-digit numbers (2000–5999) were prefixed with 48 and 5-digit numbers (60000–79999) were prefixed with 8.

The remaining 5-digit numbers in the Newport area (50000–59999 and 62000–69999) were prefixed with 2 in 1990. Since then all numbers have been 6-digit and the previous prefixes have been reused by other communications providers.

References

1633
Newport, Wales